Jordan Trainor (born 31 January 1996) is a New Zealand rugby union player who currently plays as an fullback for the New Orleans Gold in Major League Rugby (MLR).

Youth career

Born and bred in Auckland, Trainor attended St Peter's College in the city and went on to represent  at under-18 level before heading south to Waikato to attend university.

Senior career

Trainor was a winner of the Sir Edmund Hillary scholarship which saw him attend the University of Waikato.

Super Rugby

Trainor was named in the  wider training group ahead of the 2016 Super Rugby season, however, injury meant that he didn't make any appearances during the campaign.

International

Trainor was chosen as a member of the New Zealand Under-20 side which competed in the 2016 World Rugby Under 20 Championship in England, however injury limited him to just one appearance.

References

1996 births
Living people
New Zealand rugby union players
Rugby union fullbacks
Rugby union wings
Waikato rugby union players
Auckland rugby union players
Blues (Super Rugby) players
Rugby union players from Auckland
People educated at St Peter's College, Auckland
LA Giltinis players
New Orleans Gold players